Oxynoemacheilus longipinnis is a species of loach in the family Nemacheilidae endemic to the Meymeh River, formerly a part of the Tigris-Euphrates system in Iran. Fishbase lists it as the only species in the monotypic genus Ilamnemacheilus.

References

longipinnis
Freshwater fish of Asia
Fish described in 2005
Taxa named by Brian W. Coad
Taxa named by Teodor T. Nalbant